The Clyde-class lifeboat was operated by the Royal National Lifeboat Institution (RNLI) from two of its stations in the United Kingdom,  and . Only three vessels were built for the RNLI, however a fourth vessel was built in the Netherlands to the same lines as 70-001 and 70-003 as a pilot boat for Trinity House.

History
Following a visit in the early sixties to lifeboat societies in the Netherlands and West Germany, which successfully employed cruising lifeboats, the RNLI's Management Committee decided to sanction the construction of two such boats for RNLI service. The first two boats went on trials in 1966 and in 1968 went on station at Clovelly and Kirkwall. The third boat was built as a relief but took over as station boat at Clovelly, with the first boat becoming the relief. It eventually became apparent that cruising type boats were not really suited to the RNLI's operations and the boats were used at their respective bases as normal lifeboats until withdrawal in 1988.

Description
The Clyde-class cruising lifeboat was the largest ever built for the RNLI and the first to have a steel hull. Both boats had similar superstructure layouts, with a flying bridge. As crews were intended to live on board, berths and messing facilities were provided.

An inflatable inshore boat was carried forward of the wheelhouse. The boats were powered by two  Gardner 8L3B 8-cylinder diesel engines driving twin screws. Eight years after the first boat had been built, it was decided to build a third Clyde as a relief boat for the first two. This was based on the Oakley hull design, but featured a completely redesigned superstructure resembling an overgrown .

RNLI fleet

Trinity House fleet

References

External links
 RNLI
 Trinity House

Royal National Lifeboat Institution lifeboats